Rhode Island elected its members August 29, 1820.

See also 
 1820 and 1821 United States House of Representatives elections
 List of United States representatives from Rhode Island

Notes

References 

1820
Rhode Island
United States House of Representatives